Florin Pătrașcu (born 12 April 1986) is a Romanian former football defender. He made his debut at senior level for FC Bihor Oradea in 2004 and in the Liga I he debuted in 2007 for Farul Constanța. In his career Pătrașcu played also for teams such as: Astra Ploiești, Politehnica Iași and Universitatea Craiova, among others.

External links
 
 

1986 births
Living people
Sportspeople from Brașov
Romanian footballers
Association football defenders
Liga I players
FCV Farul Constanța players
FC Astra Giurgiu players
CS Turnu Severin players
Liga II players
FC Bihor Oradea players
FC Delta Dobrogea Tulcea players
FC Politehnica Iași (2010) players
CS Mioveni players
CS Universitatea Craiova players
AFC Săgeata Năvodari players